The men's individual recurve competition at the 2019 European Games was held from 21 to 27 June 2019 at the Olympic Sports Complex in Minsk, Belarus.

48 archers entered the competition, with a maximum of three entries per country.

Records
Prior to the competition, the existing world, European and Games records were as follows:

72 arrow ranking round

Ranking round
The ranking round took place on 21 June 2019 to determine the seeding for the knockout rounds. It consisted of two rounds of 36 arrows, with a maximum score of 720.

Elimination rounds

Finals

Section 1

Section 2

Section 3

Section 4

References

Men's individual recurve